Theophilus Clements  was an Irish politician. He was born in County Meath and educated at  Trinity College, Dublin. Clements represented Cavan Borough from 1729 to 1745.

References

People from County Meath
Irish MPs 1713–1714
Irish MPs 1715–1727
Members of the Parliament of Ireland (pre-1801) for County Cavan constituencies
Alumni of Trinity College Dublin